The Royal Park Hotel is a luxury boutique hotel located in Rochester, Michigan. Architect Victor Saroki designed the hotel in a stately English manor house style. The hotel contains the newly renovated PARK 600 bar + kitchen. In addition, the hotel ballroom can accommodate conferences for up to 1,200 guests and dining for up to 720. Royal Park Hotel is a member of World Hotels.

History
Several celebrities have stayed there, including Paul McCartney, Hugh Hefner, Taylor Swift, and former President George W. Bush (while seeking re-election). The hotel has received the Triple A four diamond award.

Notes

Further reading

External links

Royal Park Hotel
Carino Hotels

Hotels in Michigan
Rochester, Michigan
Hotel buildings completed in 2004
2004 establishments in Michigan